Coolmine is a primarily residential suburb of Dublin, Ireland, in the jurisdiction of Fingal. It is also a townland in the civil parish of Clonsilla.

Location and access

Coolmine is located between the suburban areas of Blanchardstown (to the south-east) and Clonsilla (to the west). It is in the Dublin 15 postal district. It is roughly 15 kilometres from Dublin city. One of the largest shopping outlets in Ireland – the Blanchardstown Centre – is located in Coolmine townland, as well as other parts of greater Blanchardstown.

Public transport in Coolmine is provided by Dublin Bus, with route numbers 37 and 39 serving the area. The N3 Navan Road is the main road artery.

Coolmine railway station is on the Maynooth/M3 Parkway Western Commuter line. The station opened on 2 July 1990. Close to Coolmine railway station is a single-arch stone road bridge (over the Royal Canal) which was built between 1794-1795, with ashlar parapet walls, cut stone keystones and voussoirs.

Amenities

Coolmine woods 
In the centre of Coolmine is the Coolmine woods. Its main path is often used as a shortcut for people heading towards the Blanchardstown Shopping Centre or by schoolchildren attending Coolmine Community School. Its flat and open grass make it popular for joggers and dog-walkers while during the summer, local football teams train on the grass.

Millennium Park 
The Millennium Park is located between Coolmine and the Blanchardstown Shopping Centre. The park is run by Fingal County Council and its amenities include two all-weather astro pitches, a children's playground, dog pen, skatepark, and exercise stations.

Education 
Schools serving the area include Scoil Oilibhéir (a primary level gaelscoil which opened in 1975) and Coolmine Community School (a secondary level community school with approximately 1000 pupils enrolled).

Enterprise 
Coolmine Industrial Estate was opened on 30 May 1983 by Councillor Michael Gannon. The estate is home to a number of businesses and services such as a post office, Blanchardstown Fire Station and several small businesses. There are a number of tertiary services in the industrial estate.

Gallery

See also

 List of towns and villages in Ireland

References

Places in Fingal
Articles on towns and villages in Ireland possibly missing Irish place names
Townlands of the barony of Castleknock